Ricochet is a 1981 album by the Bay City Rollers, credited as The Rollers.  The album was the third and final release under this band name.  In Canada, it saw release on Epic Records as "The Brown Bag Album" and later appeared with a promotional sticker which said, "The Famous Brownbag Album Now Exposed!"

Ricochet was reissued on CD in 2008 with one bonus cut – "Life on the Radio (single version)".

Track listing

Personnel
Eric Faulkner – lead guitar, lead vocals and backing vocals
Duncan Faure – lead vocals and backing vocals, rhythm guitar
Alan Longmuir – guitar, bass, keyboards
Derek Longmuir – drums, percussion
Stuart "Woody" Wood – bass guitar, vocals 
Stephan Galfas – producer
Judd Lander – bagpipes, harmonica
Pat Bianco – saxophone

References

1981 albums
Bay City Rollers albums
Epic Records albums